Zaisho is a meteorite whose fall in Japan in February 1898 was seen by observers on the ground.  it remains one of only four known pallasite falls, along with Marjalahti, Mineo and Omolon.

Mineralogy

Classification

See also
 Glossary of meteoritics

References

Meteorites found in Japan
1898 in Japan